Abbott v Abbott [2007] UKPC 53 was advice from the Privy Council on a case from the Court of Appeal of Antigua and Barbuda, that is relevant for English land law and concerns the nature of constructive trusts.

Facts
Mr and Mrs Abbott were in Antigua and Barbuda and were married. There the shares would still be determined by property law. Mr Abbott was the registered owner. Mr Abbott did not dispute that Mrs Abbott had a share, but disputed the amount.

Judgment
Baroness Hale, delivering the opinion of the Board, said the following.

See also

English land law
English property law

Notes

References

English land case law
2007 in Antigua and Barbuda
2007 in case law
Judicial Committee of the Privy Council cases on appeal from Antigua and Barbuda